Lori Burton (born Dolores Diana Squeglia, September 30, 1940 - May 20, 2021) was an American singer, songwriter, and record producer.

Life and career
She was born in New Haven, Connecticut, and studied music at the University of Hartford before marrying recording engineer and later record producer Roy Cicala.  In the mid-1960s she adopted the stage name Lori Burton (the surname taken from that of popular actor Richard Burton), and recorded a single, "Yeh, Yeh, Yeh (That Boy Of Mine)" for Roulette Records, before teaming up with English-born lyricist Pam Sawyer, the wife of producer Robert Mersey.  They found success writing songs recorded by Lulu ("Try to Understand", UK #25, 1965), Patti LaBelle and the Bluebelles ("All or Nothing", US #68, 1965), The Young Rascals ("I Ain't Gonna Eat Out My Heart Anymore", US #52, 1966), and The Royal Guardsmen ("Baby Let's Wait", US #35, 1968 on reissue).

Burton and Sawyer also wrote and recorded together as The Whyte Boots, with Burton as lead singer, releasing the teenage tragedy record "Nightmare", in which two girls fight to the death over a boy, in 1966.  Writer Richie Unterberger described the record as "one of the most accurate approximations of the Shangri-Las ever recorded".  Their record company, Philips, promoted the act as a trio of female singers, none of whom actually appeared on the recordings.  In 1967, Burton co-wrote and co-produced, with Sawyer, her only solo album, Breakout, described by Unterberger as "a mixture of soul and densely produced New York mid-'60s pop/rock".   According to the album's original liner notes, Burton's demo recordings were heard by Mercury Records president Irving Green, who encouraged her to release the album under her own name.

Burton and Sawyer then auditioned for Holland, Dozier and Holland, who had them signed to Motown as a songwriting partnership, but after a few months Burton decided to end the arrangement while Sawyer continued to work at Motown.  Burton focused on her family life for several years, before starting to contribute occasional backing vocals at the Record Plant East Studios in New York, which her husband Roy Cicala owned.  In 1974, she contributed backing vocals to John Lennon's "#9 Dream", on his Walls and Bridges album.  She also recorded songs, unissued at the time, on which Cicala and Lennon worked as co-producers;  two were released in 1998 in conjunction with the book Beatles Undercover by Kristofer Engelhardt.  Lori and Roy Cicala divorced in 1979.

Her 1967 album Breakout was reissued on CD by Rev-Ola in 2005.

She died, aged 80, in May 2021.

External links
  Discography

References

1940 births
2021 deaths
American women singer-songwriters
Musicians from New Haven, Connecticut
Singer-songwriters from New York (state)
University of Hartford alumni
21st-century American women
Singer-songwriters from Connecticut